Diuris arenaria, commonly known as the Tomaree donkey orchid or sand doubletail is a species of orchid which is endemic to a very small area of New South Wales. It has two grass-like leaves and up to nine mauve or light purple and white flowers. It has a very limited distribution near Newcastle.

Description
There are two purple, ridge-like calli extending from the base of the labellum to its midpoint. Flowering occurs from August to September.

Taxonomy and naming
Diuris arenaria was first formally described in 1999 by David Jones from a specimen collected between Nelson Bay and Shoal Bay and the description was published in The Orchadian. The specific epithet (arenaria) is a Latin word meaning "sandy".

Distribution and habitat
The Tomaree donkey orchid is only known from a small part of the Tomaree National Park where it grows in sandy soil in heathy forest.

Conservation
Diuris arenaria is classed as "endangered" under the New South Wales Biodiversity Conservation Act 2016. The main threats to the species are risk of extinction due to small distribution and population size, habitat disturbance and fragmentation, weed invasion and inappropriate fire regimes.

References

arenaria
Orchids of New South Wales
Endemic orchids of Australia
Plants described in 1999